"Good Times (Better Times)" is a song by Cliff Richard, released as a single in February 1969. It peaked at number 12 on the UK Singles Chart.

Reception
Reviewing for New Musical Express, Derek Johnson described "Good Times (Better Times)" as "a happy light-hearted and immensely danceable disc", "with a walloping bass drum, dancing strings, organ, backing brass and vocal riff chanting".

Track listing
 "Good Times (Better Times)" – 2:16
 "Occasional Rain" – 2:44

Personnel
 Cliff Richard – vocals
 Mike Vickers Orchestra – orchestra and all instrumentation

Charts

References

1969 singles
1969 songs
Cliff Richard songs
Songs written by Jerry Lordan
Songs written by Roger Cook (songwriter)
Songs written by Roger Greenaway
Columbia Graphophone Company singles
Song recordings produced by Norrie Paramor